Øystein Mathisen (born 17 March 1991) is a Norwegian politician.

He was elected representative to the Storting ((Norwegian supreme legislature) from the constituency of Nordland for the period 2021–2025, for the Labour Party. Mathisen is a journalist.

References

1991 births
Living people
Labour Party (Norway) politicians
Nordland politicians
Members of the Storting
Norwegian journalists